Diamarakro (also known as Diambarakrou) is a town in south-eastern Ivory Coast. It is a sub-prefecture of Bettié Department in Indénié-Djuablin Region, Comoé District.

Diamarakro was a commune until March 2012, when it became one of 1,126 communes nationwide that were abolished.

In 2014, the population of the sub-prefecture of Diamarakro was 31,113.

Villages
The fourteen villages of the sub-prefecture of Diamarakro and their population in 2014 are:

References

Sub-prefectures of Indénié-Djuablin
Former communes of Ivory Coast